USFL may refer to the following United States Football leagues:

United States Football League, A major American spring football league operated between 1983-1985.
United States Football League (2010), a proposed American spring football minor league that never played a game (also known as the New United States Football League).
United States Football League (2022), Active American spring football minor league (2022-present)